Chelonus is a wasp genus in the subfamily Cheloninae. Their larvae feed chiefly on larvae of moths in superfamilies Tortricoidea and Pyraloidea.

Species 

 Chelonus abditus
 Chelonus abductor
 Chelonus aberrans
 Chelonus abnormalis
 Chelonus absonus
 Chelonus abstrusus
 Chelonus aciculatus
 Chelonus aculeatus
 Chelonus acuminatus
 Chelonus acutigaster
 Chelonus acutiusculus
 Chelonus acutulus
 Chelonus adjunctus
 Chelonus aelleniae
 Chelonus agathis
 Chelonus agilis
 Chelonus ahngeri
 Chelonus akmolensis
 Chelonus alaicus
 Chelonus albicinctus
 Chelonus albofasciatus
 Chelonus albomacula
 Chelonus albor
 Chelonus alexeevi
 Chelonus algiricus
 Chelonus aligarhensis
 Chelonus alius
 Chelonus alpinus
 Chelonus alter
 Chelonus alternator
 Chelonus alticinctus
 Chelonus altilis
 Chelonus altimontanus
 Chelonus altitudinis
 Chelonus alveatus
 Chelonus amaculatus
 Chelonus amandus
 Chelonus amurensis
 Chelonus andrievskii
 Chelonus angustatus
 Chelonus angustiventris
 Chelonus angustulus
 Chelonus angustus
 Chelonus anivicus
 Chelonus annularius
 Chelonus annulatus
 Chelonus annulicornis
 Chelonus annuliflagellaris
 Chelonus annulipes
 Chelonus antennalis
 Chelonus antenventris
 Chelonus anthracinus
 Chelonus antillarum
 Chelonus antropovi
 Chelonus anxius
 Chelonus apicalis
 Chelonus apistae
 Chelonus arcuatilis
 Chelonus areolatus
 Chelonus argutus
 Chelonus arisanus
 Chelonus armeniacus
 Chelonus arnoldii
 Chelonus artoventris
 Chelonus artus
 Chelonus ashmeadii
 Chelonus asiaticus
 Chelonus assimilis
 Chelonus atripes
 Chelonus audeoudiae
 Chelonus aughei
 Chelonus auricornis
 Chelonus australiensis
 Chelonus australis
 Chelonus azerbajdzhanicus
 Chelonus badachshanicus
 Chelonus balchanicus
 Chelonus balkanicus
 Chelonus balkhashensis
 Chelonus basalis
 Chelonus basicinctus
 Chelonus basifemoralis
 Chelonus basilaris
 Chelonus basimacula
 Chelonus basimaculatus
 Chelonus baskunchakensis
 Chelonus batrachedrae
 Chelonus bedfordi
 Chelonus belokobylskiji
 Chelonus beyarslani
 Chelonus bickleyi
 Chelonus bicoloricornis
 Chelonus bicoloripes
 Chelonus bicolorus
 Chelonus bidens
 Chelonus bidentatus
 Chelonus bidentulus
 Chelonus bifidus
 Chelonus bifoveolatus
 Chelonus bifurcatus
 Chelonus bigener
 Chelonus bigus
 Chelonus biliosus
 Chelonus bimaculatus
 Chelonus binus
 Chelonus bipicturatus
 Chelonus bispinus
 Chelonus bituberculatus
 Chelonus bituminalis
 Chelonus bitumineus
 Chelonus blackburni
 Chelonus bolsoni
 Chelonus bonellii
 Chelonus bosonohyi
 Chelonus brachyurus
 Chelonus brasiliensis
 Chelonus brevicella
 Chelonus brevicornis
 Chelonus brevifemoralis
 Chelonus brevifemur
 Chelonus brevigenis
 Chelonus brevimalarspacemis
 Chelonus brevimetacarpus
 Chelonus brevioculatus
 Chelonus breviradialis
 Chelonus breviradis
 Chelonus brevis
 Chelonus breviventris
 Chelonus brunniventris
 Chelonus bucculentus
 Chelonus budapesti
 Chelonus budrysi
 Chelonus burjaticus
 Chelonus burksi
 Chelonus buscki
 Chelonus busckiella
 Chelonus bussyi
 Chelonus caboverdensis
 Chelonus calcaratus
 Chelonus calligoni
 Chelonus canescens
 Chelonus capensis
 Chelonus capsa
 Chelonus capsularis
 Chelonus capsulifer
 Chelonus caradrinae
 Chelonus carbonator
 Chelonus carinatikovi
 Chelonus carinatus
 Chelonus carinigaster
 Chelonus cariniventris
 Chelonus caulicola
 Chelonus cautus
 Chelonus cavifrons
 Chelonus cavipodex
 Chelonus ceanothi
 Chelonus cedropadicus
 Chelonus centralis
 Chelonus cephelanthi
 Chelonus cereris
 Chelonus chailini
 Chelonus chalchingoli
 Chelonus changaicus
 Chelonus changbaishanensis
 Chelonus chasanicus
 Chelonus chilensis
 Chelonus chinensis
 Chelonus chrysobasis
 Chelonus chrysogaster
 Chelonus chrysomacula
 Chelonus chrysostigma
 Chelonus chrysotegula
 Chelonus chrysozona
 Chelonus chryspedes
 Chelonus cinctipes
 Chelonus cingulipes
 Chelonus circulariforameni
 Chelonus circumfissuralis
 Chelonus circumfossa
 Chelonus circumrimosus
 Chelonus circumscriptor
 Chelonus cisapicalis
 Chelonus cisdauricus
 Chelonus clausus
 Chelonus clavinervis
 Chelonus clypealis
 Chelonus cnephasiae
 Chelonus compositus
 Chelonus compressor
 Chelonus concentralis
 Chelonus conformis
 Chelonus confusus
 Chelonus connectens
 Chelonus consociatus
 Chelonus constrictus
 Chelonus continens
 Chelonus contractellus
 Chelonus contractus
 Chelonus contrarius
 Chelonus convexus
 Chelonus coriaceus
 Chelonus cornutus
 Chelonus corvulus
 Chelonus cosmopteridis
 Chelonus crassitarsis
 Chelonus crassus
 Chelonus cratospilumi
 Chelonus creteus
 Chelonus curtigenis
 Chelonus curtimetacarpus
 Chelonus curtus
 Chelonus curvimaculatus
 Chelonus curvinervius
 Chelonus curvipes
 Chelonus cushmani
 Chelonus cycloporus
 Chelonus cylindricus
 Chelonus cylindrus
 Chelonus cyprensis
 Chelonus cypri
 Chelonus cyprianus
 Chelonus daanyuanensis
 Chelonus dauricus
 Chelonus decaryi
 Chelonus declivis
 Chelonus decorus
 Chelonus delphinensis
 Chelonus denticulatus
 Chelonus deogiri
 Chelonus depressus
 Chelonus devexus
 Chelonus devius
 Chelonus diaphor
 Chelonus discolorius
 Chelonus disjunctus
 Chelonus disparilis
 Chelonus dolicocephalus
 Chelonus dolosus
 Chelonus dreisbachi
 Chelonus dwibindus
 Chelonus eaous
 Chelonus egregicolor
 Chelonus elachistae
 Chelonus elaeaphilus
 Chelonus elasmopalpi
 Chelonus electus
 Chelonus elegans
 Chelonus elegantulus
 Chelonus elenae
 Chelonus elongates
 Chelonus elongatulus
 Chelonus elongatus
 Chelonus emeljanovi
 Chelonus empherus
 Chelonus endomius
 Chelonus ensifer
 Chelonus equalis
 Chelonus erdosi
 Chelonus ergeniensis
 Chelonus ermolenkoi
 Chelonus erosus
 Chelonus errabundus
 Chelonus erraticus
 Chelonus erratus
 Chelonus erroneus
 Chelonus erythrogaster
 Chelonus erythropodus
 Chelonus erythropus
 Chelonus erythrosoma
 Chelonus eucosmae
 Chelonus eugenii
 Chelonus euphorbiae
 Chelonus eurous
 Chelonus euryspilus
 Chelonus excisus
 Chelonus exilis
 Chelonus eximius
 Chelonus falkovitshi
 Chelonus fatigatus
 Chelonus fenestratus
 Chelonus ferganicus
 Chelonus ferulae
 Chelonus fischeri
 Chelonus fisetshkoi
 Chelonus fissilis
 Chelonus fissus
 Chelonus fistulatus
 Chelonus flagellaris
 Chelonus flavens
 Chelonus flavicoxis
 Chelonus flavipalpis
 Chelonus flavomarginalis
 Chelonus flavoneavulus
 Chelonus flavoscaposus
 Chelonus foersteri
 Chelonus formosanus
 Chelonus formosovi
 Chelonus fornicatus
 Chelonus fortispinus
 Chelonus foveiventris
 Chelonus foveolatus
 Chelonus frater
 Chelonus fraternus
 Chelonus frontalis
 Chelonus fujianensis
 Chelonus fulgidus
 Chelonus fumarius
 Chelonus fumidus
 Chelonus fumipennis
 Chelonus fuscipennis
 Chelonus gastrus
 Chelonus gauldi
 Chelonus gayi
 Chelonus genalis
 Chelonus glabrifrons
 Chelonus gladiclypis
 Chelonus gladius
 Chelonus gohoi
 Chelonus gossypicola
 Chelonus gossypii
 Chelonus gozmanyi
 Chelonus graciflagellum
 Chelonus gracilariae
 Chelonus gracilis
 Chelonus gracitis
 Chelonus grandipunctatus
 Chelonus grapholithae
 Chelonus gratus
 Chelonus gravenhorstii
 Chelonus gryoexcavatus
 Chelonus guadunensis
 Chelonus guamensis
 Chelonus gussakovskii
 Chelonus hadrogaster
 Chelonus heliopae
 Chelonus helleni
 Chelonus hemiagathis
 Chelonus heraticus
 Chelonus herbigradus
 Chelonus hiemalis
 Chelonus hirmaculatus
 Chelonus hispanicus
 Chelonus hofferi
 Chelonus holisi
 Chelonus hoppingi
 Chelonus hubeiensis
 Chelonus humilis
 Chelonus hurdi
 Chelonus hurtus
 Chelonus hyalinus
 Chelonus ibericus
 Chelonus icteribasis
 Chelonus immaculatus
 Chelonus impressiventris
 Chelonus improcerus
 Chelonus inanitus
 Chelonus incisus
 Chelonus incrassus
 Chelonus indericus
 Chelonus indicus
 Chelonus insepultus
 Chelonus inserenus
 Chelonus insidiator
 Chelonus insidiatrix
 Chelonus insidiosus
 Chelonus insincerus
 Chelonus insolitus
 Chelonus insuetus
 Chelonus insulanus
 Chelonus insularis
 Chelonus intercessor
 Chelonus interpositus
 Chelonus iranicus
 Chelonus iridescens
 Chelonus irremeabilis
 Chelonus irreprehensus
 Chelonus irrisor
 Chelonus irritator
 Chelonus irritus
 Chelonus irrugator
 Chelonus irruptus
 Chelonus iskenderi
 Chelonus ismayi
 Chelonus isolatus
 Chelonus istriensis
 Chelonus jacobsoni
 Chelonus jaicus
 Chelonus jakuticus
 Chelonus japonicus
 Chelonus jilinensis
 Chelonus johni
 Chelonus jonaitisi
 Chelonus jordanicus
 Chelonus juldashevi
 Chelonus jungi
 Chelonus justus
 Chelonus kalmykorum
 Chelonus karadagensis
 Chelonus karadagi
 Chelonus karakalensis
 Chelonus karakumicus
 Chelonus kasachstanicus
 Chelonus kaszabi
 Chelonus kazakhstanicus
 Chelonus kazenasi
 Chelonus keiferiae
 Chelonus kellieae
 Chelonus kermakiae
 Chelonus kerzhneri
 Chelonus keteper
 Chelonus kiritshenkoi
 Chelonus kirvus
 Chelonus klugei
 Chelonus knabi
 Chelonus konkaputus
 Chelonus kopetdagicus
 Chelonus koponeni
 Chelonus koreanus
 Chelonus kostylevi
 Chelonus kotenkoi
 Chelonus kozlovi
 Chelonus krivokhatskyi
 Chelonus krombeini
 Chelonus kryzhanovskii
 Chelonus kughitangi
 Chelonus kyrgisorum
 Chelonus labipalpis
 Chelonus lacteipennis
 Chelonus laevifrons
 Chelonus lamellosus
 Chelonus laplandicus
 Chelonus latens
 Chelonus laticeps
 Chelonus laticinctus
 Chelonus latifossa
 Chelonus latifunis
 Chelonus latitemporis
 Chelonus latrunculus
 Chelonus lavernae
 Chelonus leleji
 Chelonus leptogaster
 Chelonus leucomaculus
 Chelonus liber
 Chelonus lissocephalus
 Chelonus lissofossa
 Chelonus lissogaster
 Chelonus lissoscutellaris
 Chelonus lissosoma
 Chelonus lodosus
 Chelonus longidiastemus
 Chelonus longihair
 Chelonus longioculis
 Chelonus longipalpis
 Chelonus longipedicellus
 Chelonus longipes
 Chelonus longirimosus
 Chelonus longistriatus
 Chelonus longitarsumis
 Chelonus longiusculus
 Chelonus longiventris
 Chelonus longqiensis
 Chelonus longulus
 Chelonus lugubris
 Chelonus lukasi
 Chelonus lunari
 Chelonus lunaris
 Chelonus lunatus
 Chelonus lunulatus
 Chelonus luteipalpis
 Chelonus lutoga
 Chelonus luzhetzkji
 Chelonus luzonicus
 Chelonus macrellips
 Chelonus macrocorpus
 Chelonus macros
 Chelonus maculibasis
 Chelonus magadani
 Chelonus magnifissuralis
 Chelonus magnipunctus
 Chelonus majusdentatus
 Chelonus makarkini
 Chelonus malayanus
 Chelonus malinellae
 Chelonus marshakovi
 Chelonus marshi
 Chelonus masoni
 Chelonus maudae
 Chelonus mccombi
 Chelonus medicaginis
 Chelonus medinus
 Chelonus mediterraneus
 Chelonus medus
 Chelonus megacephalus
 Chelonus megaspilus
 Chelonus mellipes
 Chelonus meridionalis
 Chelonus mesotellus
 Chelonus metatarsalis
 Chelonus mexicanus
 Chelonus microcella
 Chelonus microchelonoides
 Chelonus microfamosus
 Chelonus microphtalmus
 Chelonus microsomus
 Chelonus mikhaili
 Chelonus milkoi
 Chelonus minifissus
 Chelonus minifossa
 Chelonus minimus
 Chelonus minutissimus
 Chelonus minutus
 Chelonus minytellus
 Chelonus mirabilis
 Chelonus mirandus
 Chelonus mirumis
 Chelonus miscellae
 Chelonus mishi
 Chelonus missai
 Chelonus mitigatus
 Chelonus modestus
 Chelonus moldavicus
 Chelonus mongolicus
 Chelonus montanus
 Chelonus monticola
 Chelonus moravicus
 Chelonus moriokensis
 Chelonus moskovitus
 Chelonus mucronatus
 Chelonus muesebecki
 Chelonus multirimosus
 Chelonus multistriatus
 Chelonus munakatae
 Chelonus muratus
 Chelonus mushanus
 Chelonus myartsevae
 Chelonus mysticorum
 Chelonus nachitshevanicus
 Chelonus naethrus
 Chelonus nanus
 Chelonus narayani
 Chelonus narendrani
 Chelonus nartshukae
 Chelonus narynicus
 Chelonus nebraskensis
 Chelonus nigellus
 Chelonus niger
 Chelonus nigricans
 Chelonus nigricornis
 Chelonus nigricoxatus
 Chelonus nigrimembris
 Chelonus nigrinervis
 Chelonus nigrinus
 Chelonus nigripalpis
 Chelonus nigripennis
 Chelonus nigripes
 Chelonus nigritibialis
 Chelonus nigritulus
 Chelonus nigritus
 Chelonus nikolskajae
 Chelonus nomas
 Chelonus notaulii
 Chelonus noyesi
 Chelonus obliquis
 Chelonus obscuratus
 Chelonus obturbatus
 Chelonus ocellatus
 Chelonus oculator
 Chelonus olgacola
 Chelonus olgae
 Chelonus ononicus
 Chelonus opaculus
 Chelonus opacus
 Chelonus orchis
 Chelonus orenburgensis
 Chelonus orientalis
 Chelonus orotukanensis
 Chelonus ovalis
 Chelonus oviventris
 Chelonus pachytellus
 Chelonus pallidus
 Chelonus pallipeser
 Chelonus palpalis
 Chelonus palpator
 Chelonus pannonicus
 Chelonus pappi
 Chelonus papua
 Chelonus paradoxus
 Chelonus paralunaris
 Chelonus parverticalis
 Chelonus parvus
 Chelonus paucifossa
 Chelonus paululus
 Chelonus pecki
 Chelonus pectinophorae
 Chelonus pectoralis
 Chelonus pedator
 Chelonus pellucens
 Chelonus periplocae
 Chelonus pertristis
 Chelonus pertusus
 Chelonus peruensis
 Chelonus pesenkoi
 Chelonus petilusi
 Chelonus petrovae
 Chelonus phalloniae
 Chelonus phaloniae
 Chelonus phthorimaeae
 Chelonus pictipes
 Chelonus pictus
 Chelonus pikeni
 Chelonus pilicornis
 Chelonus pilosulus
 Chelonus pini
 Chelonus plainifacis
 Chelonus planiventris
 Chelonus plenus
 Chelonus plesius
 Chelonus podlussanyi
 Chelonus polycolor
 Chelonus ponapensis
 Chelonus ponderosae
 Chelonus popovi
 Chelonus porteri
 Chelonus posjeticus
 Chelonus praepusillus
 Chelonus probabilis
 Chelonus procericornis
 Chelonus processiventris
 Chelonus productus
 Chelonus prolatricornis
 Chelonus propodealis
 Chelonus propodealoides
 Chelonus proteus
 Chelonus prunicola
 Chelonus przewalskii
 Chelonus pseudasiaticus
 Chelonus pseudobasalis
 Chelonus pseudoscrobiculatus
 Chelonus puerilis
 Chelonus punctatus
 Chelonus punctifossa
 Chelonus punctipennis
 Chelonus punctiscutellaris
 Chelonus pusilloides
 Chelonus pusillus
 Chelonus pusio
 Chelonus pygmaeus
 Chelonus quadriceps
 Chelonus quadrimaculatus
 Chelonus radialis
 Chelonus raoi
 Chelonus rectangularis
 Chelonus recurvariae
 Chelonus repeteki
 Chelonus retrorsus
 Chelonus retroversus
 Chelonus retrusus
 Chelonus retusus
 Chelonus rhagius
 Chelonus rimosus
 Chelonus ripaeus
 Chelonus riphaeicus
 Chelonus risorius
 Chelonus ritchiei
 Chelonus robertianus
 Chelonus rogezensis
 Chelonus rohdendorfi
 Chelonus rokkina
 Chelonus rostratus
 Chelonus rostrornis
 Chelonus rotundifossa
 Chelonus rubens
 Chelonus rubicunndis
 Chelonus rubiginis
 Chelonus rubriventris
 Chelonus rudolfae
 Chelonus ruficollis
 Chelonus ruficornis
 Chelonus rufifossa
 Chelonus rufinatumer
 Chelonus rufipedator
 Chelonus rufipes
 Chelonus rufiscapus
 Chelonus rufisignatus
 Chelonus rufiventris
 Chelonus ruflavus
 Chelonus rufoscapus
 Chelonus rufus
 Chelonus rugicollis
 Chelonus rugilobus
 Chelonus rugosinotum
 Chelonus rugosivertex
 Chelonus rugulosus
 Chelonus ruptor
 Chelonus rutshuricus
 Chelonus sagaensis
 Chelonus sagittatus
 Chelonus saileri
 Chelonus saipanensis
 Chelonus saksauli
 Chelonus salebrosus
 Chelonus salicis
 Chelonus salomonis
 Chelonus sassacus
 Chelonus scaberrimus
 Chelonus scabrator
 Chelonus scabrosus
 Chelonus schizogaster
 Chelonus scrobiculatus
 Chelonus sculleni
 Chelonus sculptur
 Chelonus sculptureatumus
 Chelonus scutellatus
 Chelonus secundus
 Chelonus semenovi
 Chelonus semihyalinus
 Chelonus semilissus
 Chelonus semilunaris
 Chelonus septemdecimplex
 Chelonus sericeus
 Chelonus setaceus
 Chelonus seticornis
 Chelonus severini
 Chelonus seyrigi
 Chelonus shafeei
 Chelonus shenefelti
 Chelonus shennongensis
 Chelonus shestakovi
 Chelonus shevyryevi
 Chelonus shoshoneanorum
 Chelonus shyamus
 Chelonus shyrvanicus
 Chelonus signatus
 Chelonus silvestrii
 Chelonus similis
 Chelonus sinensis
 Chelonus sinevi
 Chelonus sinuosus
 Chelonus smirnovi
 Chelonus sobrinus
 Chelonus sochiensis
 Chelonus sochii
 Chelonus sochiorum
 Chelonus socors
 Chelonus solidus
 Chelonus sonorensis
 Chelonus sordipalpis
 Chelonus spasskensis
 Chelonus spiniger
 Chelonus spinosus
 Chelonus starki
 Chelonus stenogaster
 Chelonus sternalis
 Chelonus sternatus
 Chelonus striatiscuta
 Chelonus striatus
 Chelonus subabditus
 Chelonus subabstrusus
 Chelonus subagathis
 Chelonus subamandus
 Chelonus subangustatus
 Chelonus subannulatus
 Chelonus subarcuatilis
 Chelonus subbasalis
 Chelonus subcapsulifer
 Chelonus subcaudatus
 Chelonus subcontractus
 Chelonus subcorvulus
 Chelonus subelaeaphilus
 Chelonus subelegantulus
 Chelonus subfenestratus
 Chelonus subflagellaris
 Chelonus subgenalis
 Chelonus submarginalis
 Chelonus submuticus
 Chelonus subpedator
 Chelonus subplanus
 Chelonus subpusillus
 Chelonus subrimulosus
 Chelonus subseticornis
 Chelonus subsulcatus
 Chelonus subtilistriatus
 Chelonus subtuberculatus
 Chelonus subventosus
 Chelonus subversatilis
 Chelonus subverticalis
 Chelonus sugonjaevi
 Chelonus sulcatus
 Chelonus suturalis
 Chelonus swellinervis
 Chelonus szepligetii
 Chelonus tabonus
 Chelonus tadzhicus
 Chelonus tadzhikistanicus
 Chelonus tagalicus
 Chelonus talitzkii
 Chelonus talyshensis
 Chelonus talyshicus
 Chelonus tanycoleosus
 Chelonus tarbagataicus
 Chelonus tatricus
 Chelonus tauricola
 Chelonus tauricus
 Chelonus tedzhenicus
 Chelonus tegularis
 Chelonus telengai
 Chelonus temporalis
 Chelonus temulentus
 Chelonus tengisi
 Chelonus tenuicornis
 Chelonus teretiventris
 Chelonus tersakkanicus
 Chelonus testaceus
 Chelonus tettensis
 Chelonus texanus
 Chelonus tianchiensis
 Chelonus tingutanus
 Chelonus tjanshanicus
 Chelonus tobiasi
 Chelonus tolii
 Chelonus tongkingensis
 Chelonus topali
 Chelonus tosensis
 Chelonus townsendi
 Chelonus transbaicalicus
 Chelonus transversus
 Chelonus tricoloratus
 Chelonus triquetrus
 Chelonus trukensis
 Chelonus tsagannuri
 Chelonus tshatkalicus
 Chelonus tuberculatus
 Chelonus tuberosus
 Chelonus tunetensis
 Chelonus turgidus
 Chelonus tuvinus
 Chelonus ubsunuricus
 Chelonus uniformis
 Chelonus unimaculatus
 Chelonus uralicus
 Chelonus uzbekistanicus
 Chelonus vaalensis
 Chelonus walkleyae
 Chelonus varus
 Chelonus watti
 Chelonus vaultclypeolus
 Chelonus ventosus
 Chelonus versatilis
 Chelonus verticalis
 Chelonus vescus
 Chelonus wesmaelii
 Chelonus vickae
 Chelonus victoriensis
 Chelonus victorovi
 Chelonus vitalii
 Chelonus vitasi
 Chelonus vitiensis
 Chelonus vitimi
 Chelonus volgensis
 Chelonus volkovitshi
 Chelonus vulcaniellae
 Chelonus vulgaris
 Chelonus xanthofossa
 Chelonus xanthoscaposus
 Chelonus xanthozona
 Chelonus xenia
 Chelonus yasumatsui
 Chelonus zaitzevi
 Chelonus zeravshanicus
 Chelonus zorkuli
 Chelonus zygophylli

References

External links 
 
 

Braconidae genera